Lesbian, gay, bisexual, & transgender (LGBT) people in Palestine face a precarious situation due to a lack of civil rights legislation aimed at tackling discrimination. There is also a significant legal divide between the West Bank and the Gaza Strip. In the West Bank, same-sex acts were decriminalized in the adoption of the Jordanian Penal Code of 1951 following the Jordanian annexation. Gaza, however, still follows the British Mandate Criminal Code Ordinance, No. 74 of 1936, which outlaws same-sex acts between men, with the current punishment being up to 10 years in prison.

Criminal law and civil rights
In the State of Palestine, there is no specific, stand-alone civil rights legislation that protects LGBT people from discrimination or harassment. While hundreds of queer Palestinians are reported to have fled to Israel because of the hostility they face in Palestine, they have also been subject to house arrest or deportation from Israel by Israeli authorities on account of the in-applicability of the law of asylum to areas or nations in which Israel is in conflict.

According to a 2010 compendium of laws against homosexuality produced by the International Lesbian, Gay, Bisexual, Transsexual and Intersex Association (ILGA), the decriminalization of homosexuality in Palestine is patchwork. On the one hand, same-sex acts were decriminalized in the Jordanian-controlled West Bank in 1951 and remain so to this day. On the other hand, in the Gaza Strip, the British Mandate Criminal Code Ordinance, No. 74 of 1936 remains in force and continues to outlaw same-sex acts between men. Because queer women are not subjects of the code, their relations are thus, technically, not unlawful.  According to Amnesty International's 2020 report on Palestine, "Section 152 of the Penal Code in Gaza criminalizes [male] consensual same-sex sexual activity and makes it punishable by up to 10 years' imprisonment." Palestine has no civil rights laws that protect LGBT people from discrimination nor harassment.

The Palestinian Authority has not legislated either for or against homosexuality. "On the legal level, the President of the Palestinian Authority issued his first decision on 20 May 1994 which provided that legislation and laws that were effective before 5 June 1967 in the West Bank and Gaza Strip would remain effective" – and, in line with almost all other Palestinian laws, the confused legal legacy of foreign occupation – Ottoman, British, Jordanian, Egyptian and Israeli – continues to determine the erratic application or non-application of the criminal law to same-sex activity and gender variance in each of the territories.

In 2013, a gay Palestinian man told reporters that "local Palestinian Authority police are aware and keep files on him and other homosexuals, blackmailing them into working as spies and informants." He reported stories "of guys being called at random and told to come into [Palestinian Authority] police stations, with threats their families would be told about their sexuality if they didn't show up."

The same report noted that Israeli intelligence offered another gay Palestinian man free entry into Israel on an ongoing basis to visit his Israeli boyfriend if he provided "the names of the organizers, the religious people in the villages and names of children throwing stones at Israeli military jeeps." The report noted that Mossad had been tracking his location through his cell phone. The man did not cooperate despite fear that the Israelis would reveal his sexuality to his family and community, who would reject him. It is not reported if anything subsequently was disclosed.

In February 2016, the armed wing of Palestinian militant group Hamas (classified as a terrorist organization by the United Kingdom, the EU, Canada, Israel, Japan and the United States) which rules Gaza executed Mahmoud Ishtiwi  - one of the group's leading commanders - under allegations of gay sex and theft. Ishtiwi left two wives and three children.

In August 2019, the Palestinian Authority announced that LGBT groups were forbidden to meet in the West Bank on the grounds that they are "harmful to the higher values and ideals of Palestinian society". This was in response to a planned conference in Nablus by Al-Qaws, a Palestinian LGBT group. The ban was later withdrawn by the end of the month following backlash.

Marriage and family
Gay Palestinians frequently seek refuge in Israel fearing for their lives, especially fearing death from members of their own families. "According to lawyer Shaul Gannon, from the Israeli LGBT organization The Aguda – Israel's LGBT Task Force, around 2,000 Palestinian homosexuals live in Tel Aviv at any one time."

Media and cultural references
Several Israeli films and or television programs have dealt with the issue of LGBT Palestinians, often having relationships with LGBT Israelis. However, none of these films have been directed by LGBT Palestinians.
 Hide and Seek (1980) - An Israeli drama film addressing themes of homosexuality between an Israeli Jew and a Palestinian Arab; the film is set in Mandatory Palestine in 1946.
 Drifting (1983) – An Israeli film dealing with LGBT themes features two Palestinian men, among the many people that the hero meets and interacts with while looking for love.
 The Bubble (Ha-Buah) (2007) – Two gay men, an Israeli and a Palestinian, face prejudice and other challenges while they date each other in Tel Aviv.
 Zero Degrees of Separation – Explores the challenges facing same-sex couples in Israel when one of the partners is Palestinian or Arab.
 Out in the Dark (2012) – A romance between two gay men, an Israeli and a Palestinian. They put as much effort as they can to stay together, regardless of the law.
The Invisible Men (2012) – From Israeli filmmaker Yariv Mozer, an informative documentary on the struggles of what it means to be gay in Palestine. It follows the lives of men who escaped because of their sexuality. Now hiding in Tel Aviv, they must face another set of challenges.

HIV/AIDS
A Palestinian National AIDS/HIV Health program was established in 1998.  Dr. Ezzat Gouda is the current doctor focusing on sexually transmitted diseases for the Palestinian Ministry of Health. Reports claim that very few people have become infected since 1987, and those people who are infected face prejudice and shortages of medicine.

In 2003, a report from the Palestinian Health Minister made some references to the infections, under "communicable diseases".

Activism

The main argument against LGBTQ rights in Palestine is that homosexual behavior goes against religious and traditional values. The predominant religion, Islam, disapproves strongly of homosexuality as it is viewed as unnatural. This attitude greatly influences the government and its endeavors. While LGBTQ organizations often have to undergo major setbacks, many continue to fight for equal rights.

In the early 2000s, two established groups formed to provide support to lesbian, gay, bisexual, trans, queer, and questioning (LGBTQ) Palestinian people living within the borders of Israel, the Gaza Strip and the West Bank. Al Qaws ("The bow" in Arabic, referencing a rainbow), the first official Palestinian LGBTQ organization, was founded in 2001 as a community project of the Jerusalem Open House for Pride and Tolerance to specifically address the needs of LGBTQ Palestinian people living in Jerusalem. Al-Qaws has expanded since its founding and now hosts social activities in Jerusalem, Haifa, Jaffa and the West Bank as an arena of support for members of the LGBTQ Palestinian community. Al Qaws also hosts a telephone support line.

In 2002, a second group formed to specifically address the needs of Palestinian lesbian women; Aswat ("Voices" in Arabic) was founded as a project of the Palestinian Feminist NGO Kayan, at the Haifa Feminist Center. Aswat started as an anonymous email-list serving to provide support to Palestinian gay women, and has developed into an established working group that hosts monthly meetings for its approximately 60 members, and organizes lectures, events, and educational opportunities. Aswat translates and publishes original texts related to sexuality and gender identity previously unavailable in the Arabic language, and hosts the largest collection of Arabic-language texts related to homosexuality on its website. Aswat's efforts face challenges, and a fatwa was issued against co-founder Rauda Morcos.

In 2010, the organization Palestinian Queers for Boycott, Divestment, and Sanctions (PQBDS) was formed, aimed at challenging Israeli representation of gay life in Palestine and pinkwashing. They also run a website called Pinkwatching Israel.

In 2015, a Palestinian artist named Khaled Jarrar painted a rainbow flag on a section of a West Bank wall, and a group of Palestinians painted over it. Jarrar said that he painted the rainbow flag to remind people that although same-sex marriage was legalized in the United States, Palestinians still live in occupation. Jarrar criticized the paint-over, stating that it "reflects the absence of tolerance, and freedoms in the Palestinian society".

Palestinian state police enforce moral codes of conduct, and the level of police brutality against LGBTQ people is immense. Much of that entails different levels of harassment, ranging from the obstruction of events to violence against its members. Examples include the shut down of organizational events. In August 2019, the Palestinian Authority banned LGBTQ community organizations from operating in the West Bank in response to a planned Al Qaws event.  The ban was withdrawn by the end of the month following backlash.

The LGBTQ rights movement can be a cause of dissension, as it raises questions of what freedom really means for the Palestinian people. It closely ties to the ongoing matters of the occupation of Palestine; many activists, like Maisan Hamdan, believe that once liberation is achieved for the land, this will not necessarily be followed with freedom for the LGBTQ people of Palestine.

Summary table

See also

 Human rights in the State of Palestine
 LGBT rights in Israel
 LGBT rights in the Middle East
 LGBT rights in Asia

References

External links
 Asylumlaw.org: Sexual Minorities & HIV Status (Palestine)  – various information packets used for asylum purposes
 Call to Boycott World Pride in Jerusalem 2006

Human rights in the State of Palestine
Palestine
Palestine
Palestine
LGBT in Palestine